The 1946 Akron Zippers football team was an American football team that represented the University of Akron as a member of the Ohio Athletic Conference (OAC) during the 1946 college football season. In its first season under head coach Paul Baldacci, the team compiled an overall record of 5–4 record with a mark of 3–4 in conference play and was outscored by a total of 134 to 122. The team played its home games at the Rubber Bowl in Akron, Ohio.

The Akron football team had been suspended after the 1942 season due to World War II. The 1946 season marked the school's return to intercollegiate football.

Schedule

References

Akron
Akron Zips football seasons
Akron Zippers football